Rory Butcher (born 16 March 1987) is a Scottish racing driver from Kirkcaldy; Scotland, currently competing in the British Touring Car Championship (BTCC) for Toyota Gazoo Racing UK, having made his debut in the BTCC for Motorbase Performance in August 2017. Butcher has also competed in several other series during his career, including the Scottish Formula Ford Championship, the Porsche Carrera Cup Great Britain, the British Formula Ford Championship, the British GT Championship and the European Le Mans Series.

Career

British Touring Car Championship
In 2017, Butcher joined the series from the Knockhill round in August, replacing Luke Davenport who was injured during the qualifying session for the earlier round at Croft.

Personal life
Butcher's brother-in-law is Gordon Shedden, three-time champion in the British Touring Car Championship and World Touring Car Cup competitor. Aside from his racing career, Butcher is an instructor – like his brother-in-law – and the events operation manager at the Knockhill Racing Circuit, owned by his father Derek.

Racing record

Complete British Touring Car Championship results
(key) (Races in bold indicate pole position – 1 point awarded just in first race; races in italics indicate fastest lap – 1 point awarded all races; * signifies that driver led race for at least one lap – 1 point given all races)

References

External links

1987 births
Living people
British Touring Car Championship drivers
British GT Championship drivers
Scottish racing drivers
British racing drivers
Porsche Carrera Cup GB drivers
Britcar 24-hour drivers
24H Series drivers
FIA Motorsport Games drivers
World Touring Car Cup drivers
Toyota Gazoo Racing drivers
European Le Mans Series drivers
AF Corse drivers